The Nordic Vikings was a professional ice hockey team from Beijing, China.

Ice hockey
The Nordic Vikings played one season as a member of Asia League Ice Hockey during the 2005–06 season at the Hosa Skating Center. The Nordic Vikings finished fifth place of nine teams during the regular season, and were eliminated in the first round of the playoffs, losing three games to one to Oji Eagles.

Bandy
In 2014, the Nordic Vikings was one of the initiators of the China Bandy Federation.

References

External links
 Official website
 Asia League team profile
 2005–06 Asia League ice hockey archives

Asia League Ice Hockey teams
Ice hockey teams in China
Defunct ice hockey teams
Bandy in China
Ice hockey clubs established in 2005
Ice hockey clubs disestablished in 2006
2005 establishments in China
2006 disestablishments in China